Pristimantis gentryi is a species of frogs in the family Strabomantidae. It is endemic to central Ecuador where it is found in a small area west of the Páramo de Apagua, Cotopaxi Province. The specific name gentryi honors Alwyn Gentry, American botanist who perished during his field work in Ecuador. Common name Pilalo robber frog has been proposed for this species.

Description
Adult males measure  and adult females  in snout–vent length. The snout is short. Tympanic membrane is absent and tympanic annulus is usually absent. Fingers and toes have narrow lateral keels but no webbing; the digital discs are small but distinct. The dorsum is brown with little pattern, but a pale labial stripe is present. Dorsal skin is smooth to feebly warty; dorsolateral folds are usually distinct. The venter is cream with small brown flecks. The posterior surfaces of the thighs are brown.

Habitat and conservation
Pristimantis gentryi inhabits high-altitude ( asl) cloud forests, presumably also high-altitude bush lands and grasslands. It is threatened by habitat loss caused by deforestation from agricultural development and human settlement.

References

gentryi
Frogs of South America
Amphibians of the Andes
Amphibians of Ecuador
Endemic fauna of Ecuador
Páramo fauna
Amphibians described in 1997
Taxa named by William Edward Duellman
Taxa named by John Douglas Lynch
Taxonomy articles created by Polbot